Parastrongylus schmidti is a species of parasitic nematode in the genus Parastrongylus. It was first described as Angiostrongylus schmidti in 1971 from the marsh rice rat (Oryzomys palustris) in Florida, but later assigned to Parastrongylus.

See also 
 List of parasites of the marsh rice rat

References

Literature cited 
Kinsella, J.M. 1971. Angiostrongylus schmidti sp. n. (Nematoda: Metastrongyloidea) from the rice rat, Oryzomys palustris, in Florida, with a key to the species of Angiostrongylus Kamensky, 1905 (subscription required). The Journal of Parasitology 57(3):494–497.
Kinsella, J.M. 1988. Comparison of helminths of rice rats, Oryzomys palustris, from freshwater and saltwater marshes in Florida. Proceedings of the Helminthological Society of Washington 55(2):275–280.

Rhabditida
Parasitic nematodes of mammals
Parasites of rodents
Nematodes described in 1971